Flight from the USSR is David Turashvili's 2008 novel.   
Flight from the USSR, the first novel from one of Georgia’s most famous authors, Dato Turashvili, was originally published in Georgia in 1988. Since then, it has been adapted as a stage play entitled “Jeans Generation” and translated into German, Dutch, Italian, Greek, Armenian, and Croatian.

Background
The novel is based on the most tragic and scandalous story of the 1980s Soviet Georgia. Seven young people hijacked an airplane to escape from the Soviet Union, which was an exceptional action, because at that time even thinking about escaping from the Soviet Union was considered to be a crime.

The Soviet government condemned most of these young people to death for their naive and dangerous attempt. The public opinion was split. A part of the public considered the youngsters to be just ordinary terrorists. The other part would argue that living under the Soviet regime was so unbearable that this could even justify the hijacking of a plane.

Aeroflot Flight 6833

On 18 November 1983, seven young people, all sons of Georgian intellectual élite families – attempted to flee the Soviet Union by hijacking an airliner of the state-run Aeroflot company. Among the hijackers were the painters Gia Tabidze, Davit Mikaberidze, and Soso Tsereteli, the actor Gega Kobakhidze (who had just been selected to play a role in Tengiz Abuladze's subsequently famous film Repentance), and the physicians Paata and Kakhi Iverieli. They pretended to be a wedding party, boarded the airliner in Tbilisi, and tried to divert it to Turkey. There were 57 passengers and seven crew members on board.

The captain, Akhmatger Gardapkhadze, and the co-pilot, Vladimir Gasoyan (both of them were subsequently awarded the titles of the Hero of the Soviet Union) made sharp maneuvers to prevent the hijackers from taking aim. The hijackers were forced out of the flight deck but several people were injured in a clash. Rather than concede to the hijackers' demands, the pilot circled Tbilisi and later landed.

The Georgian Communist Party chief, Eduard Shevardnadze, called for the deployment of an élite Soviet special unit Alpha Group from Moscow. On day two of the hijacking the Alpha group stormed the aircraft and arrested the surviving hijackers. The incident claimed the lives of three crew members, two passengers and three hijackers. The aircraft received 108 bullet holes during the attack, and because its structure was weakened by manoeuvres that exceeded its design limits, the aircraft was written off.

References

External links 
 Flight from the USSR on Amazon.com
 Flight from the USSR on goodreads.com
 Flight from the USSR on sulakauri.ge

2008 novels
21st-century Georgian novels
Aircraft hijackings in fiction
Young adult novels
Novels about death
Aviation novels
Historical novels